Noura is an Arabic origin given name and a surname. People with the name include:

Given name
Noura (singer), Algerian singer
Noura Alameeri (born 1988), Kuwaiti professional racing cyclist
Noura Aljizawi, Syrian political activist
Noura Alktebi, Emirati paralympic athlete 
Noura Bensaad, Tunisian writer
Noura Borsali, (1953–2017), Tunisian academic and journalist
Noura Elsayed (born 1987), Egyptian middle-distance runner 
Noura Erakat (born 1980), Palestinian American legal scholar, human rights attorney, and assistant professor
Noura Ghazi (born 1981), Syrian lawyer
Noura Hashemi (born 1983), Iranian actress
Noura Hussein, Sudanese teenager sentenced to death for killing her rapist
Noora Salem Jasim (born 1996), Nigerian-born Bahraini athlete
Noura Al Kaabi, Emirati government minister and businesswoman
Noura Mana (born 1997), Moroccan swimmer
Noura Mohamed (born 1998), Egyptian fencer
Noura Nasri, Tunisian sport shooter
Noura al Noman, Emirati science fiction writer
Noura Qadry (born 1954), Egyptian actress
Noura Rahal (born 1973), Lebanese/Syrian singer 
Noura Mohamed Saleh (born 1989), Emirati chess player
Noura bint Abdul Rahman Al Saud (1875–1950), Saudi royal
Noura bint Faisal Al Saud (born 1988), Saudi royal 
Noura bint Mohammed Al Saud, Saudi royal and jewelry designer
Noura bint Sultan Al Saud, Saudi royal
Noura Mint Seymali, Mauritanian griot, singer, songwriter, and instrumentalist
Noura Ben Slama (born 1985), Tunisian handball player
Noura Khalifa Al Suwaidi, Emirati politician
Noura Ziadi, Canadian research scientist

Surname
Mouloud Noura (born 1982), Algerian paralympic judoka

Arabic-language surnames
Arabic feminine given names